The Elga Coal Mine is a coal mine located in Sakha Republic. The mine has coal reserves amounting to 2.1 billion tonnes of coking coal, one of the largest coal reserves in Asia and the world. The mine has an annual production capacity of 9 million tonnes of coal.

Ulak — Elga railway line
The Ulak - Elga railway line is a railway line providing access to the largest coal deposit in the Russian Federation. Construction began in the year 2000, but it has been marred by lack of funds.

References 

Coal mines in Russia
Sakha Republic